Hindi Sisiw ang Kalaban Mo is a 2001 Philippine action film written, produced and directed by Roland Ledesma. The film stars Ronald Gan Ledesma, Roi Vinzon and Zoren Legaspi.

Cast

 Ronald Gan Ledesma as Rico Bernales
 Roi Vinzon as Capt. Aragon
 Zoren Legaspi as Capt. Tinio
 Rita Magdalena as May
 Ervin Mateo as Lt. Roman
 Bob Soler as Gen. Valdez
 Romy Diaz as Col. Altares
 Brando Legaspi as Marlon
 Conrad Poe as Gunner
 Johnny Vicar as Gunner
 Roy Beltran as Exec. Secretary
 Ramona Revilla as Jessica
 Jing Elizalde as Benjo
 Ben Sagmit as Tibo
 Ernie Zarate as Mr. Joson
 Daria Ramirez as Mrs. Joson
 Hanna Villame as Han
 Yoyoy Villame as Yoy
 Yam Ledesma as Yam
 Patrick Ervie Mateo as Billy
 Rhey Roldan as Anton
 Boy Alano as Egay
 Danny Labra as Dennis
 Michael Vera-Perez as Bobby
 Joker as Joe
 Thea Perez as Thea
 Tian Tian Perez as Tian Tian
 Joan Aguas as Joan
 Jun Yulo as Jun
 Bobby Dominguez as Bobby
 Monica as Cheence
 Tony Azucena as Tony

Production
The film was supposed to be part of the 2000 Metro Manila Film Festival, but was not able to make it to the cut-off. Its playdate was set to late January 2001.

References

External links

2001 films
2001 action films
Filipino-language films
Philippine action films